Europium(III) chromate is a chemical compound composed of europium, chromium and oxygen with europium in the +3 oxidation state, chromium in the +5 oxidation state and oxygen in the -2 oxidation state. It has the chemical formula of EuCrO4.

Preparation 
To obtain europium(III) chromate, an equimolar solution of europium(III) acetate and chromium(IV) oxide is dried in a vacuum at 70 °C and then heated to 400 °C in air. Another way to obtain europium(III) chromate is by reacting stoichiometric amounts of europium(III) nitrate hexahydrate and chromium(III) nitrate nonahydrate for 30 minutes at 433 K, 30 minutes at 473 K and then 1 hour at 853 K. A constant stream of oxygen is passed over the reaction mixture:

Eu(NO3)3•6H2O + Cr(NO3)•9H2O → EuCrO4 + 6 NO2 + 15H2O

Properties 
Europium(III) chromate crystallizes tetragonally with space group I41/amd (No. 141) with lattice parameters a = 722.134(1) and c = 632.896(1) pm with four formula units per unit cell

The Néel temperature of europium(III) chromate is 15.9 K. Above 700 °C, europium(III) chromate begins to decompose into europium chromite (EuCrO3).

2EuCrO4 → 2 EuCrO3 + O2

References 

Europium(III) compounds
Chromates